Flinders Quartet is an Australian string quartet. They were formed in 2000 by Helen Ireland, Zoe Knighton, Matthew Tomkins and Erica Kennedy. In 2012 Helen Ayres and Shane Chen replaced Tomkins and Kennedy. Ayres was in turn replaced by Nicholas Waters in 2015.

Karin Schaupp & Flinders Quartet's album Fandango received a nomination for the 2011 ARIA Award for Best Classical Album.

Current members
Thibaud Pavlovic-Hobba - violin
Wilma Smith - violin
Helen Ireland - viola
Zoe Knighton - cello

Past members
Nicholas Waters - violin
Shane Chen - violin
Helen Ayres - violin
Erica Kennedy - violin
Matthew Tomkins - violin

Discography

Albums

Awards and nominations

ARIA Music Awards
The ARIA Music Awards is an annual awards ceremony that recognises excellence, innovation, and achievement across all genres of Australian music. They commenced in 1987. 

! 
|-
| 2011
| Fandango (with Karin Schaupp )
| Best Classical Album
| 
| 
|-

References

External links
Flinders Quartet

Australian string quartets
Musical groups established in 2000